Stacey Ili (born 11 May 1991 in New Zealand) is a Samoan rugby union player, who currently plays as a midfield back for  in New Zealand's domestic National Provincial Championship competition and the  in Super Rugby.

Early life
Ili was a student at Onehunga High School in Auckland. While there he played rugby union for the school side. Ili also played basketball for the school. Ili was involved with Auckland from 2012 and played sevens for the side, but did not represent the senior XVs side before his move to Australia to join Melbourne Rising.

Professional rugby career

Melbourne Rising
Ili played for Melbourne Rising, the Melbourne Rebels' NRC side in the 2015 season. He made seven appearances in the nine-game regular season, starting all of them, and scored tries against North Harbour Rays, Perth Spirit and Sydney Stars as the Rising finished third to qualify for the play-offs. Ili started the play-off semi-final against the UC Vikings and scored the game's opening try after 16 minutes, but was ultimately on the losing side with the Rising beaten 50–34.

Auckland
Ili returned to his native New Zealand for the 2016 season, joining Auckland. He started on the wing for the team in their opening match away to Canterbury, where Auckland were beaten 43–3. In September 2016, it was announced that Ili had signed for Irish side Connacht, and would be joining the team within a week, meaning he would depart before the end of the season.

Connacht
Ili joined Connacht for the 2016–17 Pro12 season.

Personal life
Ili's younger brother, Shea, is a professional basketball player. Shea Ili plays as a point guard and has played internationally for New Zealand.

Super Rugby statistics

References

External links
NZ Rugby History profile
Itsrugby profile

1991 births
Living people
New Zealand rugby union players
New Zealand expatriate rugby union players
New Zealand expatriate sportspeople in Ireland
Expatriate rugby union players in Ireland
Expatriate rugby union players in Australia
Rugby union players from Auckland
People educated at Onehunga High School
Melbourne Rising players
Auckland rugby union players
Connacht Rugby players
Hawke's Bay rugby union players
Melbourne Rebels players
Samoan rugby union players
Samoa international rugby union players
Rugby union centres
Rugby union fullbacks
Rugby union wings